Aidos osorius is a moth of the Aididae family. It is found in Brazil.

References

Moths described in 1856
Zygaenoidea